Joshua Roman (born December 16, 1983) is an American cellist.

Background
An Oklahoma native, Joshua Roman attended the Cleveland Institute of Music. At CIM, he studied with Richard Aaron and Desmond Hoebig.  Roman received his Bachelor of Music Degree in Cello Performance in 2004, and his master's degree in 2005. At the age of 22, Roman was appointed principal cellist of the Seattle Symphony Orchestra in 2006, becoming the youngest principal player in Seattle Symphony history.

In 2006, the Seattle Post-Intelligencer called Roman's premiere performance an "auspicious beginning," noting that "Roman played with ease and confidence, the sound relaxed and singing, the phrasing shapely, the tone well projected seemingly without effort."

In 2007, Melinda Bargreen of the Seattle Times noted that Roman "played with heart-stopping beauty... [and his] "big, succulent tone and impassioned style perfectly suited the music."

In January 2008, Roman submitted his resignation as principal cellist at the conclusion of the 2007–2008 season to pursue a solo career.

Awards

Roman has won prizes at competitions including the Klein, ASTA, Washington, Stulberg, NFMC, H-A Music Society, Corpus Christi, Kingsville, CIM, Cleveland Cello Society and Buttram. He has performed as a member of Cleveland Orchestra, and soloed with a number of symphony and chamber orchestras including the Cleveland Institute of Music Orchestra, the Wyoming Symphony, the Oklahoma City Philharmonic and the Symphony of Southern New Jersey.

References

External links
 Joshua Roman's home page
 
"The dancer, the singer, the cellist ... and a moment of creative magic" (TED2015)

1983 births
Living people
American classical cellists
Cleveland Institute of Music alumni
Musicians from Oklahoma
Place of birth missing (living people)